FC Kommunalnik Slonim was a Belarusian football club based in Slonim, Grodno Oblast.

History
The team was founded in 1969. During the Soviet era the club played in Grodno Oblast league or lower levels of Belarusian SSR league as Torpedo Slonim (1969–1971), Kommunalnik Slonim (1972–1986), Start Slonim (1972–1986) and Albertin Slonim (since 1989).

In 1992, the team participated in the Belarusian Second League championship and won the promotion to the First League after finishing on the second place. In 1994, they were renamed to KPF Slonim and in 1996 to Kommunalnik Slonim. In 1997, Kommunalnik made its debut in the Premier League, but was relegated after 1998. The team spent one more season in top league in 2000, and then relegated again.

After ten seasons in the First League, Kommunalnik relegated again to the Second League in 2011. In January 2013, Kommunalnik merged with emerging local rivals Beltransgaz Slonim into FC Slonim (which became a continuation of Beltransgaz Slonim).

League and Cup history

External links
 Unofficial website

Defunct football clubs in Belarus
1969 establishments in Belarus
Association football clubs established in 1969
Association football clubs disestablished in 2013
2013 disestablishments in Belarus